Service Entrance (French: Escalier de service) is a 1954 French comedy drama film directed and written by Carlo Rim and starring Etchika Choureau, Danielle Darrieux and Robert Lamoureux. It was shot at the Billancourt Studios in Paris and at the Louvre Museum. The film's sets were designed by the art director Serge Piménoff.

Synopsis 
Walking alone and looking desperate, young Marie-Lou (Etchika Choureau) is taken in hand by Léo, a street photographer and his squatter friends. They all want to know what happened to her, so to satisfy their curiosity, Marie-Lou starts recounting her unfortunate experiences as a housemaid. On account of adverse circumstances, she tells them, she lost all of the jobs she had in five different families. To crown it all, the young man she has fallen in love with, a brilliant artist, is in prison.

Cast 
 Etchika Choureau as Marie-Lou
 Danielle Darrieux as Béatrice Berthier
 Robert Lamoureux as François Berthier
 Sophie Desmarets as Madame Dumény
 Jean Richard as Jules Béchard
 Saturnin Fabre as Monsieur Delecluze
 Mischa Auer as Nicolas Pouchkoff
 Alfred Adam as Le cousin Albert
 Junie Astor as Aline Béchard
 Louis de Funès as Cesare Grimaldi, the father, Italian artist
 Marc Cassot as Benvenuto Grimaldi, the son, brilliant painter
  as Carlotta Grimaldi, the daughter, prostitute
 Andréa Parisy as the second girl Grimaldi
 Marthe Mercadier as Hortense Van de Putte
 Héléna Manson as 	Madame Delecluze
 Jacques Morel as 	Georges Dumény
 Yves Robert as 	Courbessac
 Jean-Marc Thibault as 	Léopold dit Léo
 Anne Roudier as Madame Grimaldi
 Albert Michel as the sexton, friend of "Grimaldi"
 Fernand Sardou as Scarfatti, the conservative of du Louvre
 Claire Gérard as Victorine, the mechanical street-sweeper of Louvre
 René Hell as a sexton
 Sylvain Levignac as a guest in engagements
 Palmyre Levasseur as a guest in engagements
 Rudy Lenoir as inspector
 René Lefebvre-Bel as a restaurateur of pictures
 Claude Sylvain as Une copine de Léo
 Estella Blain as Une copine de Léo

References

Bibliography
 Oscherwitz, Dayna & Higgins, MaryEllen . The A to Z of French Cinema. Scarecrow Press, 2009.

External links 
 
 Escalier de service (1954) at the Films de France

1954 films
French anthology films
French comedy-drama films
1954 comedy-drama films
1950s French-language films
French black-and-white films
Films directed by Carlo Rim
Gaumont Film Company films
Films shot in Paris
Films set in Paris
Films shot at Billancourt Studios
1950s French films